Samuel or Sam Beard may refer to:

Samuel Beard (public servant) (born 1939), co-founder and president of the Jefferson Awards for Public Service
Sam Beard (born 1990), New Zealand rugby player
Samuel Beard (sailor) in 1960 Star World Championships